The Archdeacon of Achonry was a senior ecclesiastical officer within the Diocese of Achonry until 1622;Killala and Achonry from 1622 until 1834; and of Tuam, Killala and Achonry from 1834, although it has now been combined to include the area formerly served by the Archdeacon of Killala As such he was responsible for the disciplinary supervision of the clergy within his portion of the diocese. within the diocese. The Archdeaconry can trace its history back to Denis O'Miachain who in 1266 became bishop of the dioces to the last discrete incumbent George FitzHerbert McCormick.

Archdeacons
 Denis O'Miachain
 Dermit Ultagh
 Henry Sharpe
 John Archdall
 Edmund Rowlatt
 Henry Yeaden
 Thomas Walls
 Sankey Winter
 John Walls
 William Evelyn
 James Hutchinson
 Joseph Verschoyle was born in County Dublin and  educated at Trinity College, Dublin. A nephew of Bishop James Verschoyle, he was Archdeacon of Achonry from 1813 until his death in 1862.
 Hamilton Townsend
 John Gore
 George Heather
 John Geddes
 Theophilus Landey
 George McCormick

References

Archdeacons of Achonry
Lists of Anglican archdeacons in Ireland
Diocese of Tuam, Killala and Achonry